Ockers is a surname. Notable people with the surname include:

 Stan Ockers (1920–1956), Belgian cyclist
 Weyn Ockers (died 1568), Dutch Protestant iconoclastic

See also
 Ocker (surname)